Mercedes High School is a public high school located in Mercedes, Texas, and is part of the Mercedes Independent School District.

The school has a little over 1000 students and the current administration includes Principal, Mr. Ricardo Hinojosa, Assistant Principals,  Mr. Jason Acosta, and Ms. Michelle Guerra

History
Mercedes High School was originally located at 837 S Ohio St. and a second high school was built directly across the street and used until the present-day campus was built and opened in 1967. The old high school is now part of Mercedes Early College Academy. In 2002 a new complex was added to the southeast part of the school called the Career and Technical Education Unit.  In 2010, MHS plans to open new Physics labs located just outside the east and west I-halls and a new P.E. locker room located just north of the gymnasium. Mercedes High School's notable accomplishments include their division I boys soccer team winning their division's region final against Westlake High School in 2007, where they won 2-1. Also, two Tiger Baseball teams have qualified for the State Finals, in 1974 and 1986.

Sports
According to Mercedes High School's Athletic Directory, the school offers the following sports programs:

Baseball
Boys' Basketball
Boys' Cross Country
Boys' Golf
Boys' Soccer
Boys' Track
Cheerleading
Dance
Football
Girls' Athletics
Girls' Basketball
Girls' Cross Country
Girls' Golf
Girls' Soccer
Girls' Tennis
Girls' Track
Jr. High Athletics
Powerlifting
Softball
Sports Medicine
Tennis
Tiger Beat
Volleyball

Notable alumni
Natalia Anciso, Contemporary artist and educator.  Class of 2003.
 Amanda McBroom, Singer, song-writer, actress, "The Rose" composer.  Class of 1965.
Billy Gene Pemelton. 1964 Olympic pole vaulter
Elida Reyna, Tejano singer. Lead singer of Latin Grammy Award winning band Elida Y Avante.  Class of 1990.

References

External links
 

High schools in Hidalgo County, Texas
Public high schools in Texas
School buildings completed in 1967